Edwin B. Bederman (August 24, 1895 – October 3, 1934) was an American politician.

Bederman was born in Chicago, Illinois and went to the Chicago public schools. Bederman served in the United States Navy during World War I. He went to DePaul University and was admitted to the Illinois bar in October 1917. Bederman served in the Illinois House of Representatives from 1929 until his death in 1934. He was a Republican. Bederman died at his home in Chicago, Illinois from heart problems and a streptococcal infection.

Notes

1895 births
1934 deaths
Politicians from Chicago
Lawyers from Chicago
Military personnel from Illinois
DePaul University alumni
Republican Party members of the Illinois House of Representatives
20th-century American politicians
20th-century American lawyers